Leucoptera selenocycla is a moth in the family Lyonetiidae first described by Edward Meyrick in 1930. It is found in India.

References

Leucoptera (moth)
Moths described in 1930
Moths of Asia